Arantxa Sánchez Vicario and Todd Woodbridge were the defending champions but they competed with different partners that year, Sánchez Vicario with Emilio Sánchez and Woodbridge with Helena Suková.

Sánchez Vicario and Sánchez lost in the semifinals to Suková and Woodbridge.

Suková and Woodbridge lost in the final 7–5, 6–7(0–7), 6–2 against Larisa Neiland and Andrei Olhovskiy.

Seeds
Champion seeds are indicated in bold text while text in italics indicates the round in which those seeds were eliminated.

Draw

Final

Top half

Bottom half

References
 1994 Australian Open – Doubles draws and results at the International Tennis Federation

Mixed Doubles
Australian Open (tennis) by year – Mixed doubles